The 1940 Copa del Generalísimo was the 38th staging of the Copa del Rey, the Spanish football cup competition.

The competition started on 12 May 1940 and concluded on 30 June 1940 with the final, held at the Campo de Fútbol de Vallecas in Madrid.

First round

|}

Tiebreaker

|}
 Bye: Athletic Aviación

Round of 16

|}
Tiebreaker

|}

Quarter-finals

|}

Semi-finals

|}

Final

|}

External links
LFP website
 linguasport.com

1940
1940 domestic association football cups
Copa